Carrollton Historic District may refer to:

 Carrollton Downtown Historic District, Carrollton, GA, listed on the NRHP in Georgia
 South Carrollton Residential Historic District, Carrollton, GA, listed on the NRHP in Georgia
 Carrollton Courthouse Square Historic District, Carrollton, IL, listed on the NRHP in Illinois
 Carrollton Historic District (Carrollton, Kentucky), listed on the NRHP in Kentucky
 Carrollton, Louisiana, which includes or also known as Carrollton Historic District, listed on the NRHP in Louisiana
 Carrollton Historic District (Carrollton, Mississippi), listed on the NRHP in Mississippi